El Real de Gandia is a municipality in the comarca of Safor in the Valencian Community, Spain.

Transport 
The only way to arrive Real de Gandía is with line 1 of La Marina Gandiense, which connects the village with the nearby Gandía and it’s University.

References

Municipalities in the Province of Valencia
Safor